Julio Antonio Olaizola Rodríguez (born 25 December 1950) is a Spanish former footballer who played as a left back.

Club career
Born in Lasarte-Oria, Gipuzkoa, Olaizola played solely with local Real Sociedad. He made his debut as a senior with the reserves in Tercera División, where he remained five seasons.

Olaizola was promoted to the first team for the 1974–75, but only played his first game in La Liga during the following campaign, his maiden appearance in the competition occurring on 6 September 1975 as he featured the full 90 minutes in a 3–2 home win against Real Betis. He became an undisputed starter under manager José Antonio Irulegui and, as the team was already coached by Alberto Ormaetxea, contributed with a combined 58 appearances and one goal in back-to-back national championship conquests in the early 80s.

Olaizola retired in 1985, aged 34. He played 327 matches all competitions comprised for his only club.

Personal life
Olaizola's younger brother, Javier (19 years his junior), was also a footballer and a defender. He played mostly with RCD Mallorca.

Honours
La Liga: 1980–81, 1981–82
Supercopa de España: 1982

See also
List of one-club men

References

External links

1950 births
Living people
People from Lasarte-Oria
Spanish footballers
Footballers from the Basque Country (autonomous community)
Association football defenders
La Liga players
Tercera División players
Real Sociedad B footballers
Real Sociedad footballers